Pak Wai may refer to:

 Fanling Pak Wai, part of Fanling Wai
 Pak Wai, Sai Kung District, a village of Sai Kung District
 Pak Wai Tsuen, a village in Yuen Long District